Kelloggsville is an unincorporated community in Ashtabula County, Ohio, United States.

History
The first settlement at Kelloggsville was made in the early 19th century.  Kelloggsville owes its name to a Mr. Kellogg, an early settler.

References

Unincorporated communities in Ashtabula County, Ohio
Unincorporated communities in Ohio